Lozarevo is a village in Sungurlare Municipality, in Burgas Province, in southeastern Bulgaria.

It is identified by modern scholars with the medieval fortress town of Goloe.

References

Villages in Burgas Province